Gundel is a German language  surname derived from a given name beginning with gund "battle". Notable people with the name include:

 Bence Gundel-Takács (1998), Hungarian football player
 Jeanette Gundel (1942–2019), American linguist
 Károly Gundel (1883–1956), Hungarian restaurateur

References 

German-language surnames
Surnames from given names